Panzu Ernesto de Angelo (born 3 April 1999) is a professional footballer who plays as a midfielder. Born in Germany, he represents the Angola national team.

International career
Ernesto debuted or Angola in a 3-0 friendly win over Mozambique on 23 October 2020.

References

External links
 
 
 DFB Profile

1999 births
Living people
Footballers from Berlin
Angolan footballers
Angola international footballers
German footballers
Germany youth international footballers
German people of Angolan descent
German sportspeople of African descent
Association football midfielders
Hertha BSC II players
Berliner AK 07 players
Regionalliga players